Alfonso Araújo Cotes  is a Colombian politician, two time Governor of the Department of Cesar; the first term between September 21, 1968, and August 21, 1970, and the second term between June 7, 1975, and August 30, 1997.

Governor of Department of Cesar (1968-1970)

Cabinet

Secretary of Government: Luis Rodriguez Valera
Secretary of Development: Jesus Alejo Duran
Administrative Office Chief: Adalberto Ovalle
Chief of Planning: Francisco Ramos Pereira
Chief of Judicial Bureau: Jorge Eliecer Rincon
Private Secretary: Pedro Garcia Diaz

References

Colombian governors
Ambassadors of Colombia to Panama
Governors of Cesar Department
Colombian Liberal Party politicians
Living people
Year of birth missing (living people)